Iannucci is a surname. Notable people with the surname include:

 Antonio Iannucci (1914–2008), Italian prelate of the Roman Catholic Church
 Armando Iannucci (born 1963), Scottish comedian, writer, director, performer, and radio producer
 Athan Iannucci (born 1982), professional lacrosse player
 Robert Iannucci (born 1955), American computer scientist

Italian-language surnames
Patronymic surnames
Surnames from given names